Usal or Oosal is a Maharastrian dish made of legumes such as peas, lentils, black eyed beans, Matki, Moong or Hyacinth beans. Generally the beans are soaked in water and allowed to sprout for a day or two. The sprouted beans are stir fried along with onions, spices and curry leaves in oil. A little water is added to cook the sprouts. It usually has a thick gravy. The use of spices vary according to the sprouts used and according to taste.

See also 
Misal

References 

Maharashtrian cuisine